Denys Skoryi (born April 16, 1979) is a surgeon, oncologist, professor, and politician from Kharkiv, Ukraine. For almost 20 years, Skoryi has been working in different Ukrainian medical facilities as a physician, surgeon, oncologist, and manager. In 2016, he became one of the youngest regional medical facility CEOs in Ukraine, when he overhauled the Kharkiv Regional Center of Oncology. Skoryi gained notoriety and political weight, turning the facility from the worst medical establishment of its class in Ukraine to one of the best, pioneering state-of-the-art medical procedures, and cutting the facility’s original mortality rate by more than a factor of two by 2020. Skoryi accomplished this by raising additional public money for the Center from local businesses and inviting the best doctors from all over Ukraine to join his team. In 2020, Skoryi joined Bloc Svitlychna Together!, a political party led by Yuliya Svitlychna and was elected to the Kharkiv Oblast Council of VIII convocation in order to influence the distribution of government funds for regional medicine, including channeling more funding for the Regional Center of Oncology. In 2013 and 2014, Skoryi acquired international grants from the International Surgical Society and Japanese Hepato Biliary-Pancreatic Surgery Society. In 2015, Skoryi received the Saint Luke Medal, a medal awarded to leading Ukrainian physicians and surgeons. 

From 2004 to 2008, Skoryi worked in the Central Hospital in Valky, Ukraine and the Institute of General and Urgent Surgery of the National Medical Academy of Ukraine (NMAU) in Kharkiv, Ukraine. From 2008 until 2016, Skoryi was a senior research fellow and leading researcher at the department of liver surgery of the Institute of General and Urgent Surgery of the NMAU. In 2013, Skoryi acquired his Doctor of Sciences degree. From 2016 and as of 2021, Skoryi is the professor at the oncology department of the Kharkiv National Medical University and the CEO of the Kharkiv Regional Center of Oncology.

In 2016, the Kharkiv Oblast Council did a full overhaul of the old Kharkiv Regional Clinical Oncological Center due to numerous mismanagement issues in the facility. Soon after, Skoryi became the CEO of the newly reorganized Kharkiv Regional Oncology Center. At the time, the medical institution was considered the worst of its kind in Ukraine. Skoryi brought together a team of experienced doctors from all over Ukraine, and started partnerships with international colleagues and facilities. Under his management, the Oncology Center was developed and renovated. Skoryi's team opened new departments, started to perform unique surgeries, inventing and patenting new medicinal methods and medical equipment. Through Skoryi's lobbying, the construction works for the new Oncology Center's building started.

Over the years, Skoryi actively negotiated and was in open opposition to the Healthcare Department of the Kharkiv Oblast Council, in particular because of the lack of governmental funding, freedom of management, and inefficient interference of the regional council in his Center's activities. Skoryi's various activities in the medical industry, his desire to improve the Center and his relationship with political figures such as a former National Deputy of the Healthcare Department of Verkhovna Rada, Iryna Sysoyenko, and a former Governor of Kharkiv Oblast, Yuliya Svitlychna, led him to become a political figure himself. As a member of the Kharkiv Oblast Council of VIII convocation, Skoryi is aiming his forces to further develop his Oncology Center as well as try to improve the Ukrainian medical industry overall. In 2021, he came up with new medical initiatives. Those are: free screening program, which could help decrease the number of cancer patients with neglected and life-threatening levels of the disease and the establishment of compact moving medical laboratories, where people can get early health testing for free.

Personal life and family

Skoryi was born on April 16, 1979, in Kharkiv, Ukraine. He is married to Iryna Skora. The couple has two daughters.

Education

In 2002, Skoryi graduated with a bachelor's degree with honors from the Kharkiv National Medical University. From 2002 to 2004, Skoryi held an internship at the Institute of General and Urgent Surgery of the National Medical Academy of Ukraine (NMAU) in Kharkiv and in the Central Hospital of Valky, Ukraine (distance education).

In 2008, Skoryi graduated early from the Institute of General and Urgent Surgery of the NMAU in Kharkiv, Ukraine. Upon his graduation, he acquired the Candidate of Sciences degree, which is the first of the two scientific degrees in some post-Soviet countries and may be recognized as the Doctor of Philosophy degree.

In 2013, Skoryi acquired his Doctorate in Sciences degree, which is a higher doctoral degree and the highest of the two scientific degrees in some post-Soviet countries.

Career

Medical and teaching career (2004–present)

From 2004 to 2005, Skoryi worked as a surgeon in the Central Hospital in Valky, Ukraine. In 2005, he transferred to the Institute of General and Urgent Surgery of the National Medical Academy of Ukraine (NMAU) in Kharkiv, Ukraine, where he worked in this capacity until 2008.

In 2008–2013, Skoryi was a senior research fellow  and in 2013–2016, a leading researcher at the department of liver surgery of the Institute of General and Emergency Surgery of the NMAU. In 2011, Skoryi became a part of a medical team which was one of the first in Ukraine to perform bloodless surgeries on livers, split liver resections, extended and multivisceral liver resection. For these surgeries, the team invented a gas-jet surgical scalpel, which cuts the tissue with carbon dioxide.

From 2007 to 2015, Skoryi took part in various medical training courses in Ukraine and abroad, including Russia, China, Austria, Japan, Germany, and South Korea.

From 2016 and as of 2021, Skoryi teaches at the oncology academic department of the Kharkiv National Medical University and is a chief executive officer (CEO) of the municipal nonprofit Regional Center of Oncology in Kharkiv.

From 2018, Skoryi was a chief researcher in the Ukrainian branch of the multinational pharmaceutical and biotechnology company AstraZeneca.

As of 2021, Skoryi co-authored and registered 12 medicinal patents, published 111 scientific articles in medical periodicals, and released 4 monographs.

CEO of the Kharkiv Regional Oncology Center (2016–present)

Appointment to the position

The Kharkiv Regional Center of Oncology is a medical facility in Kharkiv that provides medical services for cancer patients.

In 2016, an inspection from Kharkiv Oblast Council (Kharkiv Regional Council) stated that the Center was in "emergency condition"; its management was corrupt and provided dubious medical care. The previous management was fired and the Center was reorganized as a municipal nonprofit enterprise under the name of the Regional Center of Oncology.

Through voting of the Kharkiv Oblast Council, Skoryi was elected the new CEO of the Center. He was elected for a 5-year term and became one of the youngest regional medical facility CEOs in Ukraine. He brought a new team of doctors with him to occupy managerial and other positions.

When the new team came to manage the Regional Oncology Center, two of its hospital buildings were reported as half destroyed and in need of a complete renovation. The Center lacked modern medical equipment. At the time, the medical facility was considered the worst of Ukrainian oncology centers.

Funding issues and political opposition

In 2016, when the Kharkiv Oblast Council reorganized the old Oncological Center into the Regional Center of Oncology, they promised to support the new facility on an administrative level and provide funds for its further development.

Since 2017, the Kharkiv regional government funded the staff's wages, hospital's utilities, and maintenance of the facility. As time passed, the management of the Center did not get any additional government funding to pay for buildings renovations or new equipment. Instead of providing support, regional authorities sent numerous inspections to check the facility, which interfered with the hospital's workflow and did not result in any positive changes. According to Skoryi, this and other regional authorities' actions towards the Center, such as delays in wages and in providing other promised funds, were signs of intentional pressure from the local government. On the other hand, the Healthcare Department of the Kharkiv Oblast Council stated they were doing enough to support the facility, their inspections were focused on benefitting the establishment in the future, and the hospital's management would not cooperate.

Skoryi and his team maintained and developed the new facility with the help of some non-governmental funds donated by public organizations, volunteers, and other Ukrainian doctors and medical facilities. The Regional Oncology Center's management opened new departments to create adequate surgical and research areas and patients' wards. Skoryi's team formed the facility's International Board of Trustees, which included several members of public organizations.

Eventually, the local authorities provided some additional funding to the facility. The moneys were allocated to the Center through a 2017 tender in order to do partial renovations in one of the Center's buildings. The regional authorities also voiced their plans to fund other renovations with the help of the European Investment Bank. However, later the Center was extracted from the list of facilities for renovation due to unprovided necessary documentation, although according to Skoryi all the necessary documentation was in fact provided.

In 2020, the Oncology Center's main source of funding was the Ukrainian National Healthcare Service as well as donations from volunteers, public organizations, private companies and medical workers and facilities.

In addition to other issues, on several occasions, the new management was hindered by the Healthcare Department of the Kharkiv Oblast Council. They lobbied their own managers for the Center's authority body and would not cooperate on the coordination of the facility's schedule. In November 2017, a new bill was passed by Verkhovna Rada of Ukrainian (Parliament of Ukraine), which allowed hospital administrators to manage their facilities on their own. In particular, they were allowed to personally coordinate the hospital schedule, hire or fire people, as well as to control wages, and so on. Nevertheless, these activities could still be partially overseen by regional government. Thus, while most of the other hospital directors received freedom in their facilities, the Healthcare Department still attempted to interfere with Skoryi's activity as Center's director.

In connection to all of these issues, Skoryi was in open conflict with the Kharkiv Regional Council's Healthcare Department and led active discussions and negotiations with them in regard to his facility all through 2017. In his fight, he received strong support from Ukrainian politician, lawyer, and at the time National Deputy of the Healthcare Department of Verkhovna Rada, Iryna Sysoyenko and Governor of Kharkiv Oblast in 2016–2019, Yuliya Svitlychna.

Regional Oncology Center's development and achievements (2016–present)

Under Skoryi's management, the Regional Oncology Center team adopted internationally acclaimed treatment and workflow principles and medical protocols. Its patients started to receive modern and individual treatment and prescriptions. The new team started to work in partnership with international oncology establishments and specialists and to perform some unique and complex surgeries in Ukraine, some being a rare practice even for international facilities. They also started to receive invitations to perform surgeries abroad.

In 2017, for the first time in Ukrainian history, to conceal post-surgical defects on patient's thorax, the Regional Center of Oncology team replaced the defect with a special metallic construction and moved a part of a back muscle (without cutting it out) and skin tissue from patient's back to his chest. Also in 2017, the Regional Center of Oncology team invented and were the first in the world to use the new methodology of the transcaval access to the inferior vena cava (a large vein that carries the deoxygenated blood from the lower and middle body into the right atrium of the heart). The new methodology consisted of crossing the vein below the place affected by a tumor, lift it up, and cut out the tumor. The methodology was invented in order to avoid prosthetics of the inferior vena cava during the surgical removal of tumors. In this particular surgery, the method also helped save patient's kidney and nerves, that are responsible for pelvic movements.

In first four months in charge of the new facility, Skoryi and his team opened several new hospital departments, including the department of hepato-pancreato-biliary surgery (which focuses on medical procedures related to liver, pancreas, and biliary tract), department of anesthesiology, and an intensive care unit. They created new surgery rooms, the department of diagnosis, and reorganized administrative departments. The facility's medical equipment was also modernized. From January to May 2017, the Center enrolled 6,096 patients and the staff performed 1,041 surgeries, meanwhile the post-surgical mortality dropped almost by half. By November 2017, overall hospital mortality dropped by 40%.

In summer 2017, the Center of Oncology joined an online project "Available Medicine" created in partnership with Ukrainian activists, international fund "Revival", and the United Nations Development Program in Ukraine. The project is a website which posts lists of medications provided by the government funding and available in Ukrainian medical care facilities for free.

In 2018, 18,000 patients received treatment in the Center and 4,000 surgeries were performed.

During the COVID-19 pandemic in 2020, the Regional Center of Oncology became one of the few medical facilities in Kharkiv to build new "oxygen track" (a mechanical system, that provides oxygen to patients via special equipment) to replace those being in operation for the past 10 years. The oxygen track is usually used for providing oxygen to patients, who are still partially able to breathe on their own. This step is taken prior to patient's connection to artificial lung ventilation machine. Skoryi started the project to provide necessary medical care, if needed, to his cancer patients. According to statistics, cancer patients are more likely to get infected by the COVID-19 virus and develop a range of life-threatening complications. That same year, free COVID-19 tests were provided for the Center's patients and medical staff. It was provided within the Ukrainian Federation Against Cancer project funded by private medical clinic.

Within three and a half years of the new management's work, hospital mortality has decreased by more than a factor of two. The number of surgeries, including the more complex ones and the ones never done before increased by 1.5 times. By 2020, the management started working according to international cancer diagnostics and treatment principals. This included creation of the interdisciplinary teams to research and treat oncology pathologies of liver, pancreas, stomach, colon and rectum, thoracic cavity organs, breasts, head and neck, and reproductive organs, skin and other. Such commissions usually consist of a surgeon, chemotherapist (doctor who treats cancer with anti-cancer drugs), oncologist, radiation therapist, radiation oncologist, and pathologist. The material and technical foundation of the facility increased by eight times.

Oncology Center's global reconstruction (2018–2020)

Starting in 2017, Skoryi lobbied for the global reconstruction of the two Oncology Center's old buildings as well as for construction of the new modern building. In 2017, the Governor of Kharkiv Oblast at the time, Yuliya Svitlychna discussed the issues of the Center at Government of Ukraine meetings promoting its addition to the list of facilities, that would be reconstructed with the help of the European Investment Bank funding. She also helped Skoryi to stock the Center with some of the necessary equipment. 

In 2018, the new decentralization law in Ukraine gave more power and recourses to local governments of the country. Thanks to this and Skoryi and Svitlychna's previous partnership and actions, the construction works for the new Oncology Center building were confirmed. It was considered to be a huge step towards creating more adequate space for patients and doctors as well as the development of a whole new medical complex. That year, in addition to funds provided to local authorities, Svitlychna promised to get funding for the new hospital building from general government budgets as well.

In December 2018, the construction works officially started for the new 4-story Oncology Center building. The construction works for the building were considered to be on "a very large scale," the building was planned to occupy . At the same time, in one of the old buildings of the Center two reanimation facilities and new surgery rooms were in construction, and complete restoration of patients' wards was in action. Additionally, the Oncology Center team received some new equipment.

Through 2019, the foundation for the new building as well as renovations in the old buildings were concluded. However, in 2020 all construction works for the new building were frozen and the budget which was provided by the regional authorities was redirected to fund other regional matters. As of 2021, the construction works for the new building are postponed. Some call the future of the new Oncology Center building "unclear."

Political career

Kharkiv Oblast Council

After the long-term partnership with Yuliya Svitlychna between 2017 and 2020, Skoryi became a part of her political party Bloc Svitlychna Together!. In 2020, Skoryi entered the Kharkiv Oblast (Kharkiv Regional) election as member of the Bloc Svitlychna Together! led by Yuliya Svitlychna. He stated he "did not see another way" to promote and make the improvements happen in his Oncology Center and in Ukrainian medical industry overall. He stated one of his aims is to create adequate working conditions and options for development in the medical field for Ukrainian doctors (the majority of whom left their profession or fled the country due to intolerable working conditions). 

During the 2020 Ukrainian local elections, Skoryi was elected one of 120 members of the Kharkiv Oblast Council of VIII convocation as a member of the Bloc Svitlychna Together!.

Initiatives

In 2021, Skoryi proposed to expand the regional healthcare program by adding a new system of free early screening tests for people without any symptoms in order to prevent the development of the colorectal cancer, breast cancer, and cervical cancer to life-threatening levels.  As of 2021, the statistics shows that colorectal cancer is the most common type of oncology illnesses people have in the Kharkiv Oblast: out of 10,000 new cancer cases annually 1,400 are colorectal cancer patients. According to Skoryi, a new screening system could help drastically decrease the number of people with the neglected stage of the disease by detecting it in earlier stages. Skoryi's proposition to establish the new system was declined by other regional council members. Only 16 out of 96 present council members supported the initiative.

Another Skoryi idea, rejected by the regional council, was the establishment of the compact moving medical offices, a sort of "laboratory on the wheels." The idea was to provide free medical screening and timely health check-ups for people who live in small Ukrainian villages and towns, where people either can't or won't go to the hospital (which sometimes is situated in other locality) to get a check-up.

Despite these setbacks, as of 2021 Skoryi works on new strategies of lobbying these and other medical novelties. He and his team work on creating video guides to promote healthy lifestyle and encourage people to get early screening tests and get regular health check-ups.

Awards and grants

National awards

 2015: Skoryi received the Saint Luke Medal, a medal to leading Ukrainian physicians and surgeons.

International awards and grants

 2013: International Surgical Society Foundation Travel Scholarship Award
 2014: Travel Grant of Japanese HepatoBiliary-Pancreatic Surgery Society

See also 

 Yuliya Svitlychna
 Iryna Sysoyenko
 Kharkiv Oblast Council 
 Kharkiv National Medical University

References

Literature cited 

21st-century Ukrainian physicians
21st-century Ukrainian politicians
Ukrainian surgeons
Academic staff of Kharkiv National Medical University
Physicians  from Kharkiv
Politicians from Kharkiv
1979 births
Living people